Release Me is a 2012 compilation album of eleven rare and previously unreleased studio performances by American singer Barbra Streisand. 

A companion compilation of ten more unreleased tracks followed in 2021: Release Me 2.

Overview
Streisand announced the album's release on her official website in August 2012. It contains tracks recorded between her 1967 Simply Streisand and 2011 What Matters Most albums, gathering unreleased material from, among others, Stoney End, The Broadway Album, and Back to Broadway.  The compilation's release was accompanied by a series of short video clips posted onto YouTube, in which Barbra discussed every track. A music video for "I Think It's Going to Rain Today" was directed, photographed and edited by Matt Amato.

The album debuted at #7 on the Billboard 200 albums sales chart (with approximately 40,000 copies sold), making this her 32nd Top 10 album and her 6th consecutive Top 10 effort since The Movie Album in 2003.

Track listing
 "Being Good Isn't Good Enough" (From Hallelujah, Baby!) – 3:30 (Intended for The Broadway Album)
 "Didn't We" – 2:36 (Intended for aborted album The Singer in 1970)
 "Willow Weep for Me" – 3:31 (Intended for Simply Streisand)
 "Try to Win a Friend" – 4:07 (Intended for Streisand Superman)
 "I Think It's Going to Rain Today" – 3:27 (Intended for Stoney End)
 "With One More Look at You" (From A Star Is Born) – 3:39 (Unreleased studio take)
 "Lost in Wonderland" – 3:33 (Often cited as being recorded during the What About Today? sessions) 
 "How Are Things in Glocca Morra?"/"Heather on the Hill" (From Finian's Rainbow/Brigadoon) – 4:34 (Intended for unreleased version of Back to Broadway)
 "Mother and Child" – 5:03 (Intended for aborted album Life Cycle Of A Woman)
 "If It's Meant to Be" – 4:08 (Intended for What Matters Most)
 "Home" (From The Wiz) – 3:37 (Intended for The Broadway Album)

Charts

References

External links
Barbra Archives: Release Me (2012)
"I Think It's Going to Rain Today" lyric video

2012 compilation albums
Barbra Streisand compilation albums
Legacy Recordings albums